Adrian Michael Alto Amatong (born April 20, 1978), known as Ian Amatong, is a Filipino publisher and politician from the province of Zamboanga del Norte, currently serving as Congressman in the House of Representatives of the Philippines representing the 3rd legislative district of Zamboanga del Norte since 30 June 2022.

Early life
Amatong was born on April 20, 1978, the second of three children of Isagani Amatong and Anita Alto.

Career

Publishing career
Amatong served as publisher and managing editor of the Mindanao Observer, a community newspaper owned by the Amatong family. Apart from this, he also served as one of the trustees for Mindanao of the Philippine Press Institute, a position he held since 2017.

Political career
Amatong's early political career started when he first ran for vice governor of Zamboanga del Norte in the 2007 local elections, but lost. He ran for a seat in the Zamboanga del Norte Provincial Board for the second legislative district, but lost likewise. After the election of his father Isagani as representative of the province's third legislative district, Amatong served as his chief-of-staff prior to his participation in the 2022 elections.

In 2022 Amatong ran for a seat for Zamboanga del Norte's third legislative district in the Philippine House of Representatives, to succeed his father. However, prior to election day, news was spread that Amatong supposedly announced his withdrawal from the congressional race, to which he vehemently denied rumors.

He won in this election against former representative Cesar Jalosjos and two other candidates.

References

Ian
Living people
Liberal Party (Philippines) politicians
Politicians from Zamboanga del Norte
Members of the House of Representatives of the Philippines from Zamboanga del Norte
1978 births